Blanca Busquets Oliu (Barcelona, 1961) is a Catalan journalist and writer. She is the author of nine novels, for which she has won the 2011 Catalan Booksellers' Prize and the 2015 Alghero Donna Award in Italy. As a journalist, she has worked for Catalunya Ràdio, Catalan public radio broadcaster, since 1986.

Literary work

Novel
 La casa del silenci (The House of Silence). Rosa dels Vents, 2013
 La nevada del cucut (The Last Snow), Rosa dels Vents, 2010
 Vés a saber on és el cel (Heaven Knows where the Sky is), Rosa dels Vents, 2009
 Tren a Puigcerdà (Train to Puigcerdà), Rosa dels Vents, 2010
 Presó de Neu (Prison of snow), Rosa dels Vents, 2010

References 

1961 births
Living people
Writers from Catalonia
Journalists from Catalonia